The seat of the European Central Bank (ECB) is an office building complex in Frankfurt, Germany. It comprises a twin-tower skyscraper and the former Wholesale Market Hall (Großmarkthalle), with a low-rise building connecting the two. It was completed in 2014 and was officially opened on 18 March 2015.

The ECB is required by the Treaties of the European Union to have its seat within the city limits of Frankfurt, the largest financial centre in the Eurozone. The ECB previously resided in the Eurotower and, as its duties increased due to countries joining the Eurozone, in three further high-rise buildings nearby - the Eurotheum and Japan Center.

Architecture
The main office building, constructed for the ECB, consists of two towers that are joined by an atrium with four interchange platforms. The ECB premises also includes the Grossmarkthalle, a former wholesale market hall built from 1926 to 1928, fully renovated for its new purpose.

History

Development
In 1999, an international architectural competition was launched by the bank to design a new building. It was won by a Vienna-based architectural office called Coop Himmelb(l)au. The building was to be 185 meters tall (201 meters with antenna), accompanied by other secondary buildings on a landscaped site on the site of the former wholesale market (Großmarkthalle) in the eastern part of Frankfurt. The main construction work was planned to commence in October 2008, with completion scheduled for before the end of 2011.

Construction was put on hold in June 2008 as the ECB was unable to find a contractor that would build the Skytower for the allocated budget of €500 million due to the bidding taking place at the peak of the pre-late-2000s recession bubble. A year later with prices having fallen significantly the ECB launched a new tendering process broken up into segments.

It is expected that the building will become an architectural symbol for Europe and is designed to cope with double the number of staff who operate in the Eurotower. The total cost of the project was between 1.3 and 1.4 billion euros. For the total surface of 185,000 square meters, this gives a building cost in excess of 7,000 euros per square meter.

Opening
Staff began moving into the new building in November 2014, and the building was officially opened on 18 March 2015. The opening was marked by a three-day protest organised by the Blockupy movement. Ulrich Wilken, an organizer and member of the Hesse state assembly for the Die Linke party, said: “Our protest is against the ECB, as a member of the troika, that, despite the fact that it is not democratically elected, hinders the work of the Greek government. We want the austerity politics to end.” Police used water cannons and tear gas against protestors, while demonstrators threw stones at police, firefighters and Frankfurt's trams, and set fire to cars and barricades.

Headquarters Agreement
The seat of the European Central Bank enjoys special legal protections granted by an agreement with the German government. It is illegal to enter the ECB's premises to enforce a court order or execute a search warrant. It is also illegal to confiscate materials on the ECB's premises. The German government has a duty to protect the Central Bank against intruders, including foreign agents and protestors.

See also
 European Central Bank
 Eurotower
 Institutional seats of the European Union
 List of tallest buildings in Frankfurt
 List of tallest buildings in Germany
 List of tallest buildings in the European Union

References

External links

Documentary
Information, including video tour, in ECB website
Architect's website with page on the project

Buildings and structures of the European Union
Coop Himmelblau
European Central Bank
Buildings and structures completed in 2014
Skyscrapers in Frankfurt
2014 establishments in Germany
Skyscraper office buildings in Germany